Bisso Na Bisso is a music collective of rappers and singers with origins from Congo Brazzaville formed in 1999. The group consisting of  Ben-J (from Les Neg'Marrons), Lino and Calbo (from the group Ärsenik), Doc and G Kill (from 2Bal), Mystik and the only female M'Passi was put together by French rapper Passi.

The group created an album called Racines which means 'Roots' in French. The album contained a fusion of hip hop with African rhythms and sounds like rumba, zouk and soukous giving it a unique and distinctive flavour. The album also featured collaborations with prominent African musicians of the time like Koffi Olomide, Papa Wemba, Ismael Lo, Kassav and Monique Seka.

Many French rappers such as those that comprise the group Bisso Na Bisso, describe their desire to both foster solidarity among Blacks and demonstrate their pride in Africa, while simultaneously acknowledging their roots in an Urban French context.  This identity struggle represented in French rap music is further complicated by the fact that black rappers in France struggle to create a presence in the film industry and on television where French Blacks receive little exposure and being white opens doors to many more opportunities.  Rappers report their feelings of disconnect from both their homelands and from their present homes where they are unable to adequately use the media to portray the inequality in French society.

Bisso Na Bisso have spent much energy providing humanitarian aid to the Congo and other African countries, including while they are touring.

In addition to their humanitarian aide, they have been vocal in their criticism of Africa politics. In 'Dans la peau d'un chef,' they criticize the corruption of the government with lines like 'I pray for the development of my country that is falling into decay/believe me I swear to gorge myself...'

In 1999 they won three Kora Awards in the categories best arrangement, best group and  best video clip.

Members 
 DOC TMC (Landry Mahoukou) 2 Ball 'Niggets (member of the collective Ménage à 3 and ex-2 Ball 2 Neg) until his imprisonment in 1999 (sentenced until 2014, he was released in January 2006)
 G-Kill (Frederic Mahoukou) 2 Ball 'Niggets (member of the collective Ménage à 3 and ex-2 Ball 2 Neg)
 Lino (Gaëlino  M'Bani), Ärsenik
 Calbo (Calboni M'Bani), Ärsenik
 Ben-J (Fabien Loubayi), Neg' Marrons
 Mystik (Gyslain Loussingui)
 M'Passi, Melgroove (cousin of Passi)
 Passi Balende

Much of their music entails collaboration with many celebrated artists within the genres of Ndombolo and Soukous (formerly known as Congolese Rumba). These artists include, but are not limit to, Papa Wemba, Lokua Kanza, and Koffi Olomidé. Other collaborations include Franklin Boukaka (1940-1972), a Congolese artist. These collaborations reach deep into the heritage of African descent and call upon a new style that incorporates the French culture with its African roots.

Discography

Music videos 
 2009 : "Show ce soir" (directed by J.G Biggs)

References

External links 
 Amazon listing
 Translated version of the Bisso Na Bisso home page
 The "Lost Generation"

French rappers
Republic of the Congo rappers